2 Days in the Valley is a 1996 American neo noir crime comedy film written and directed by John Herzfeld. The film stars Danny Aiello, Greg Cruttwell, Jeff Daniels, Teri Hatcher, Glenne Headly, Peter Horton, Marsha Mason, Paul Mazursky, James Spader, Eric Stoltz, and Charlize Theron.

Plot
Two hitmen, Lee Woods and mafioso Dosmo Pizzo, walk into a bedroom where a sleeping couple, Olympic athlete Becky Foxx and her ex-husband Roy Foxx, are in bed. Lee injects Becky with a tranquilizer, then shoots Roy in the head. Lee and Dosmo then drive to an abandoned area off Mulholland Drive, where Lee shoots Dosmo and blows up the car in order to set Dosmo up as the fall guy for the murder. Lee flees the scene with his girlfriend, Helga Svelgen.

Dosmo was wearing a bulletproof vest and survived the shooting and car explosion. He takes shelter at the mansion of wealthy art dealer Allan Hopper, where he takes Hopper and his assistant Susan Parish hostage. Dosmo is unaware that Hopper has called his sister Audrey Hopper, a nurse, to come to the house. On her way, Audrey picks up Teddy Peppers, a down-and-out TV producer contemplating suicide.

Meanwhile, Becky awakens and discovers Roy's body in bed beside her. She runs from her house and flags down two policemen, young, ambitious Wes Taylor and cynical veteran Alvin Strayer, who are driving by. Although sympathetic, Wes begins to suspect that Becky knows more than she is saying. Becky had hired Lee and Dosmo to kill Roy for $30,000, but was unaware that they would do it in her own house. Alvin arrives at his house which is across the road from a golf course. One of the golf balls breaks Alvin’s window. Furious, he draws his revolver and confronts the golfers. Lee goes back to the house to get the money, encounters homicide detectives Creighton and Valenzuela working the crime scene, and kills them both. Wes returns to the crime scene (Without Alvin, who has to turn in his badge due to his erratic behaviour) to see if he can offer any insight on the case. Masquerading as one of the detectives, Lee lures Wes outside, intending to kill him.

At Lee’s hotel, Becky and Helga argue and get into a fight. Becky smashes a vase over Helga’s head. Helga reaches for a gun in her purse and there is a struggle in which Helga is shot and wounded.  Becky escapes with Helga firing after her. Helga finds her way to Becky's house, where Lee has knocked Wes unconscious. Lee decides to kill Helga instead of taking her to the hospital, concluding that her wound is too severe to be treated, but his gun jams. He turns to retrieve Wes's gun but finds that Helga has escaped and has flagged down a passing car, where 2 people get out to try and help her.  Another car approaches which happens to carry Dosmo and his hostages. Audrey jumps out and tries to help the dying Helga, but she dies on the roadside.

Wes is caught in the middle of a shootout between Dosmo and Lee, and is shot in the leg. Just before Lee can kill Dosmo, Teddy shoots Lee, killing him.

A grateful Wes allows Dosmo to take the $30,000 and escape with Susan. The following day, Teddy shows up at an anniversary party that Audrey is attending. As Susan and Dosmo drive down a highway, Dosmo contemplates using the money to start a pizzeria in Brooklyn.

Cast

Reception
The film was given mixed reviews from critics, with a 62% rating on Rotten Tomatoes, based on 58 reviews. Writing in The New York Times, Stephen Holden wrote the film "lacks the humanity of Short Cuts or the edgy hipness of Pulp Fiction, but it is still a sleek, amusingly nasty screen debut by a filmmaker whose television credits include an Amy Fisher melodrama." Roger Ebert gave the film three stars out of four on his rating scale, saying that it "looks like a crime movie, but crime is the medium, not the message". Teri Hatcher's performance earned her a Golden Raspberry Award nomination for Worst Supporting Actress.

Music and Score
Jerry Goldsmith composed an original orchestral score for 2 Days in the Valley that was rejected in post-production. The released film features a rock-oriented score composed by Anthony Marinelli. Goldsmith's score was released in complete form by the soundtrack label Intrada Records in 2012. A track was used from Waterlily Acoustic's album, Mumtaz Mahal, featuring Taj Mahal, Chitravina N. Ravikiran and Vishwa Mohan Byatt.

References

External links
 
 
 

1996 films
1990s crime comedy films
American crime comedy films
1990s English-language films
American neo-noir films
Films directed by John Herzfeld
Films set in the San Fernando Valley
Metro-Goldwyn-Mayer films
Rysher Entertainment films
Films scored by Anthony Marinelli
1996 comedy films
1990s American films